HMS Trinidad  was a Royal Navy  light cruiser. She was lost while serving in the Arctic on convoy duty after being damaged escorting PQ 13 in 1942.

Early career

Trinidad was built by HM Dockyard Devonport. She was laid down on 21 April 1938, launched 21 March 1941 and commissioned on 14 October 1941. The ship served with the British Home Fleet during her brief career.

Loss

While escorting Convoy PQ 13 in March 1942, she and other escorts were in combat with German  destroyers. One of her torpedoes had a fault, possibly affected by the icy waters and sub zero conditions common in the Atlantic en route to Russia; causing the torpedo to limp across the water at a speed far below the 46 knots expected, the reduced speed causing the torpedo to strike Trinidad as she performed evasive zigzags in its path, killing 32 men. Survivors included Lieutenant Commander Williams as well as composer George Lloyd, a Royal Marines bandsman who had earlier written the ship's official march. This was performed at the Last Night of the Proms on 7 September 2013, in the presence of the last surviving crewman from Trinidad.

Trinidad was towed clear of the action, and was then able to proceed under her own power towards Murmansk. The  attempted to engage and sink the damaged cruiser, but was spotted and attacked by the destroyer . On arrival in Murmansk, Trinidad underwent partial repairs.

Other ships of the Home Fleet were providing a covering force nearby. Her speed was reduced to  owing to the damage she had sustained. En route, she was attacked by more than twenty Ju 88 bombers on 14 May 1942. All attacks missed, except for one bomb that struck near the previous damage, starting a serious fire. Sixty-three men were lost, including twenty survivors from the cruiser , which had been sunk two weeks earlier. The decision was taken to scuttle her and on 15 May 1942 she was torpedoed by Matchless and sank in the Arctic Ocean, north of North Cape. Four Czechoslovak airmen en route to Great Britain – Sergeant Vratislav Laštovička, Corporals Jan Ferák, Josef Návesník and Bohuslav Zikmund – were killed, and three other airmen were rescued.

References

Bibliography

Further reading
 Pearce, Frank (1975). The Ship That Torpedoed Herself: HMS "Trinidad".

External links

WWII cruisers
HMS Trinidad at Uboat.net
IWM Interview with survivor Wallace Hughes

 

Ships built in Plymouth, Devon
1941 ships
World War II cruisers of the United Kingdom
Cruisers sunk by aircraft
Shipwrecks in the Barents Sea
World War II shipwrecks in the Arctic Ocean
Maritime incidents in May 1942
Ships sunk by German aircraft